Islands & Shores is the fourth studio album by Swedish band Deportees, released on 19 October 2011 through Deportees AB and Universal Music.

Track listing
"Islands & Shores" – 5:39
"The Doctor in Me" – 4:14
"A Heart Like Yours in a Time Like This" – 6:18
"Medicate It Right" – 4:29
"Warpaint" – 3:48
"Carry No Blow" – 4:18
"A New Name to Go By" (featuring Lykke Li) – 4:04
"The Wild in Me" – 4:00
"When Buildings Sleep" – 3:12
"Future Shocks" – 4:09

Charts

References

2011 albums
Deportees (band) albums
Universal Music Group albums